Yevgeny Ivanovich Nazdratenko (b. February 16, 1949 on board of a ship in the area of Severo-Kurilsk, Sakhalin Oblast) is a Russian politician.

In 1983, he graduated from the Far Eastern Technological Institute where he specialized in economics.

Nazdratenko was a governor of Primorsky Krai from 1993 until his resignation on February 5, 2001 following a heart attack.  It was speculated that he was forced to resign from his office, as he was blamed for an energy crisis.

Nazdratenko was appointed deputy secretary of the Security Council of Russia in 2003.

Nazdratenko is married and has two sons.

References

1949 births
Living people
Governors of Primorsky Krai
Civic Platform (Russia) politicians
21st-century Russian politicians
People from Sakhalin Oblast
People born at sea